The John W. Elliott House is a historic house in Eutaw, Alabama. The Creole cottage style structure was built in 1850 by Jesse Gibson for John Williams Elliott, a watchmaker and jeweler. Elliott was born in 1814 in Litchfield County, Connecticut. He migrated to Eutaw around 1840.  Elliott married Louisa Elizabeth Towner, a teacher and native of Rutland County, Vermont, in 1843.  They had three children, all born and raised in Eutaw.  Louisa died in 1853. John then married Blanche Smith Chapman, a native of Virginia, in 1858. The Elliott family left Eutaw prior to the outbreak of the American Civil War and relocated to Brooklyn, New York, where John Elliott died in 1888.  The house was placed on the National Register of Historic Places as part of the Antebellum Homes in Eutaw Thematic Resource on April 2, 1982, due to its architectural significance.  It has been moved elsewhere since listing.  The site is now a parking lot.

References

Houses completed in 1850
National Register of Historic Places in Greene County, Alabama
Houses on the National Register of Historic Places in Alabama
Creole cottage architecture in Alabama
Houses in Greene County, Alabama
1850 establishments in Alabama